The Dutch Lacrosse Association is the official governing body of lacrosse in the Netherlands. The Nederland Lacrosse Bond sponsors both a men's and women's national team. The national team programs are supported by a burgeoning domestic club league (the DNLL consists of 12 men's teams, while the WDNLL supports six female teams). The NLB is a full member of both the Federation of International Lacrosse (FIL) and the European Lacrosse Federation (ELF). 

The Netherlands' first international tournament was in 2004 when the men's team competed at the European Lacrosse Championships in Prague, Czech Republic. The team finished 9th out of 12 countries. Since then, the men's national team has competed at the World Lacrosse Championships in 2006, 2010, 2014 and 2018, with their best showing of 8th place in 2010. The team competed at the European Lacrosse Championships in 2008, 2012, and 2016, plus a host of smaller invitational club tournaments throughout Europe. Their best finish was a Silver medal at the 2008 ELF. 

The women's first campaign was in 2008 when the team finished 10th at the European Lacrosse Championships in Lahti, Finland. The women’s team took 7th place in 2012 and 13th place in 2015.

Men's 2018 World Lacrosse Championships, Netanya, Israel 
The Netherlands started in the white division together with  Norway and Japan. The Netherlands finished 22nd of the 46 participating teams at the world championship.

Roster: Men

Men's 2014 World Lacrosse Championships, Denver, CO, USA

Results: Men

Roster: Men

STAFF
Head coach:   Neal Powless
Assistant coach:   Bill Bjorness
Assistant coach:   Jared Fotis
Assistant coach:   Ryan Demorest
Physio:   Mary Stein
Team Manager:   Mary Bergman

Men's & Women's 2012 European Lacrosse Championships, Amsterdam, Netherlands

Results: Men

Roster: Men

STAFF
Head coach:   Michael O'Neill
Assistant coach:   Owen Zachariasse
Assistant coach:   Christopher Cooper
Assistant coach:   Ryan Demorest
Assistant:   Mike Malloy
Physio:   Stijn Haverkamp
Team Manager:   Paul Kortman

Men's 2010 World Lacrosse Championships, Manchester, England

Results

Roster

STAFF
Head coach:   Travis Taylor
Assistant coach:   Macgregor Stockdale
Assistant coach:   Travis Gillespie
Physio:   Bart Hendriks
Physio:   Daan Reutelingsperger
Team Manager:   Guy Kessels

Men's 2008 European Championship campaign 
The Netherlands competed in their second European Lacrosse Championship in 2008 in Lahti, Finland. They compiled a 6-2 record at the tournament, finishing 2nd place behind defending European champions, England. The team surprised the lacrosse world, defeating traditional European lacrosse powers such as Sweden, Ireland and Germany before making their appearance in the gold medal game. The success of the Dutch campaign garnered mention in major lacrosse publications and placed the Netherlands on the lacrosse map for the first time in history.

The Dutch team played in the C Division, featuring Austria, Denmark, France, Scotland, and Sweden. They compiled a 4-1 record in round robin play, resulting in a three-way tie for first with Sweden and Scotland, and a goals for/against record of 76/25. Goal differential determined that Sweden would finish first, with the Netherlands taking the second spot of the group. The Dutch team went on to beat Ireland and Germany in elimination play before losing to perennial champions England in the championship final. 

Many attributed the team's success in Finland to the two weeks of isolation and training in Den Helder prior to the tournament.

Game results 
The Netherlands opened the tournament with a convincing win over Austria, beating Sweden the very next day in a tightly contested 1 goal match. They then went on to beat Denmark before losing a controversial one goal game to Scotland. The team concluded group play with a lopsided victory over newcomer France. 

A second-place finish in Group C advanced the Dutch team to the knockout stage of the tournament. They beat Ireland in a closely fought one-goal quarterfinal game before rolling the Germans in a convincing 12-6 semi-final victory. 

The Dutch team played 8 games in 10 days at various fields throughout Lahti, Finland. Detailed game results are listed below.

Team organization 
At the helm of the men's national program was long time lacrosse business man, John Bergsma. John's wealth of experience within the National Lacrosse League and Team Canada was supported by coaches from both North America and the United Kingdom. Travis Taylor, a native of New Westminster, British Columbia and head coach at the University of Bristol, was named head coach, while MacGregor Stockdale (a former defenseman at Brown University), Nigel Greenall (head coach of Ashton lacrosse in Northern England), and Richard Bos (Groningen Lacrosse, Netherlands) were all hired as assistant coaches.

The team formed new sponsorships for the European campaign, dropping their previous partnerships with Riddell and STX. Team helmets were provided by New York-based Cascade Sports and all equipment and apparel was provided by Michigan based Warrior Sports.

Tournament preparation 
The Dutch team centralized in the Netherlands two weeks before the European Championships, bringing all players to Den Helder (in the north of the Netherlands) for an intensive 14-day training camp. 

The NLB formed a strategic partnership with the Royal Netherlands Navy, using their extensive facilities in Den Helder as preparation grounds for the campaign in Finland. In addition to their grueling three-a-day practice schedule, the Dutch team took part in several naval training exercises, followed a strict eating regime, and stayed in barracks on the base.

For press purposes, one practice was scheduled at a field outside of the base. On July 27 friends, family, and the public at large came to watch as the team practiced under a hot, sun-drenched afternoon in the city centre of Den Helder.

Men's 2006 World Championship campaign 
The Netherlands competed in their first World Lacrosse Championships in 2006 in London, Ontario, Canada. Led by a contingent of Dutch ex-pats from North America. These players included many ex (NLL)(WLA) pro players, Jonas Derks (NLL from 1998-2008) bolstered the Dutch attack, Aaron Vanderhorst (WLA 2000-2015) was noted in the midfield, Vanderhorst is on track to have competed in every World Championshil, since 2006. He will be donning the Orange of the Dutch in the 2019 World Indoor championships.  Well former UWO Mustang standout Andrew Dowdell (Major series 2000,NLL 2001)locked down the goaltending position, he was also tooted as a player to watch throughout the games, according to official program. Dowdell had suffered a shortened NLL and Major career as a result of head Injuries. Despite, his past head injuries Dowdell was rock solid in the cage for the Dutch.  The Dutch national team finished with a 3-4 record at the tournament. They also made ILF history by becoming the first team to win their debut game at their first World Championships (defeating South Korea by a score of 12-4).

The Netherlands competed in the Orange Group, featuring Germany, the Czech Republic, New Zealand, and South Korea. Competing against these countries in round-robin play, the Dutch group amassed a 2-2 record, with convincing wins over both South Korea and New Zealand. The Netherlands then went on to beat Latvia (10-4) before falling to Finland in a tightly-fought and controversial 2 goal game (final score: 8-10). The group went on to lose their last game to a talented Scotland squad, but finished the tournament in 12th place (out of 21 countries).

Game results 
The Netherlands played 7 games in 8 days, all at the North London Athletic Fields. The game results are listed below.

Team organization 
The staff, led by General Manager Cornelius Derks, was composed entirely of North American coaches during the 2006 tournament. Corny, a native of Oshawa, Ontario, performed managerial duties while David Leich (head coach of the University of Western Ontario Mustangs), Jason Crosbie (standout player from the Buffalo Bandits of the NLL), and Jim Huelskamp (Former Salisbury State University All-American) acted as assistant coaches.

Waterford Development (a Washington D.C.-based real estate developer) was the team's main sponsor. Exclusive partnerships with lacrosse equipment and apparel suppliers were formed: STX (based out of Baltimore, Maryland) provided the team with equipment while Riddell supplied the team with helmets. Atlantic Sportswear provided apparel for the Netherlands and the team was outfitted in their famous "Orange" colors.

External links
 Nederland Lacrosse Official Website
 Official 2006 World Championship Website
 International Lacrosse Federation
 Nederland Lacrosse World Championship Blog

Lac
Lacrosse governing bodies in Europe
2003 establishments in the Netherlands
Lacrosse in the Netherlands
Sports organizations established in 2003